Reeds Gap State Park is a  Pennsylvania state park in Armagh Township, Mifflin County, Pennsylvania in the United States. The park is largely a wilderness area with large white pine and hemlock trees. Honey Creek flows through the park, providing a habitat for trout.

History
Reeds Gap is a natural water gap, a geologic formation caused by Honey Creek in a ridge, Hightop. This water gap was a natural gathering location for wild animals and it became a hunting ground for Native Americans and later the European settlers. These settlers named the area New Lancaster Valley. The gap became a gathering area for the homesteaders in the Mifflin County area. They gathered at the gap for bush meetings to listen to traveling evangelists and enjoy community fellowship. These meetings lasted until the 1920s.

Edward and Nancy Reed built a sawmill along Honey Creek in the mid-19th century.  At this time the area was part of the lumber boom that swept through the wooded mountains of Pennsylvania from the mid-to-late 19th century and early 20th century. The Reeds operated the sawmill on Honey Creek for many years, until it was torn down and moved to Virginia by their son John. The trees were soon gone and the land was purchased by the Commonwealth of Pennsylvania on January 15, 1905. Parts of the land purchased by the state became Reeds Gap State Park and Poe Valley State Park.

Recreation

Hunting and fishing
Hunters are expected to follow the rules and regulations of the Pennsylvania Game Commission. The common game species are ruffed grouse, squirrels, turkey, white-tailed deer, and black bears. Honey Creek is stocked  with trout by the Pennsylvania Fish and Boat Commission. There is a population of native trout in Honey Creek and its tributaries.

Swimming and picnics
A swimming pool was built in 1965 to replace the dam in Honey Creek. It was shallow at both ends, reaching its greatest depth of five feet in the middle. Diving was prohibited. Lifeguards were stationed at the pool from 11:00 am until 7:00 pm. The main lifeguard post was located on the west side of the pool at its deepest point. The pool opened on Memorial Day weekend and closed Labor Day weekend. A much shallower "kiddie" pool was adjacent to the main pool. It was announced in March 2009 that both the adult pool and kid pool will not be reopening for the 2009 season, "amid mounting safety concerns and a long list of structural problems." The pool will be demolished, and not rebuilt. There are four wooded picnic areas at Reeds Gap State Park with 3 pavilions.

Hiking, cross-country skiing and camping
There are 5 hiking trails at Reeds Gap State Park. It begins at the park office and crosses over Reeds Gap to Poe Valley State Park. The other trails are all under  and pass through the woods and follow the banks of Honey Creek. The trails are open to cross-country skiing during the winter months. Campers are limited to using tents in the rustic camping area.

Nearby state parks
The following state parks are within  of Reeds Gap State Park:
Bald Eagle State Park (Centre County)
Greenwood Furnace State Park (Huntingdon County) 
Little Buffalo State Park (Perry County)
McCalls Dam State Park (Centre County)
Penn-Roosevelt State Park (Centre County)
Poe Paddy State Park (Centre County)
Poe Valley State Park (Centre County)
Ravensburg State Park (Clinton County)
R. B. Winter State Park (Union County)
Sand Bridge State Park (Union County)
Whipple Dam State Park (Huntingdon County)

References

External links

  

State parks of Pennsylvania
Protected areas established in 1938
Parks in Mifflin County, Pennsylvania
Water gaps of Pennsylvania
Protected areas of Mifflin County, Pennsylvania
1938 establishments in Pennsylvania